Red Comrades Save the Galaxy (Russian: Петька и Василий Иванович Спасают Галактику) is a 1998 point-and-click graphic adventure game. Developed by S.K.I.F. and published by Buka Entertainment, it is the first installment in the eponymous series. On February 18, 2016, a remastered version was released, which was compatible with newer Windows OS versions and wide-screen displays, and also supported full English subtitles.

Gameplay 
Red Comrades Save the Galaxy is a point-and-click adventure game, where the player guides three main characters — Pete, Vasily Ivanovich Chapaev, and Anka — through the game's world. Players can control the main characters through various commands; by default, players can move around (Go) and look for objects (Look) by left-clicking on the screen, while the three remaining commands (Talk, Take, and Use) are available from a drop-down main menu opened by right-clicking anywhere on the game screen.

Players can also access an inventory menu, which offers them three more options on the lid. These include the game's map (which allows fast-travel between locations), a character photograph (allowing players to interact with elements as that character), and the pause menu (also accessible by pressing the Escape key). Protagonists move using several postures determined by animation. Communication with certain characters results in branched (2-4 variants max) dialogues. Minigames may utilize specific single-use interface types.

The remastered version comes with the feature of switching between traditional and unitary interface systems, especially for touchscreen-enabled devices. For example, in the unitary system, the mini menu is activated by holding the "click" command, while the available actions can be switched by using circular finger movement. The inventory itself is displayed using the pinch gesture.

Plot 

Some elements of the plot are adapted from the novel  by Dmitry Furmanov, and borrows Russian anecdotes from the Soviet era heavily. A long time ago in galaxy far away, a huge spaceship, the size of a planet, was heading through the Solar System with millions of alien colonists on board. Something unknown goes wrong and suddenly the alien spaceship loses control of the spaceship. However, thanks to this accident Earth has obtained its very own satellite - the Moon.  Most of the aliens died in the crash and just a few of them, placed in suspended animation, survived.

With no one to reanimate them, the creatures were doomed to eternal sleep. A shot from the Russian Navy cruiser Aurora's main gun signals the beginning of the October Revolution of 1917. Drunken sailors miss the Tsar's Winter Palace and hit the Moon instead. This shot deactivated alien sleeping machines and awakened the rest of their crew. A short while after, the remaining aliens realized that there was only one hope for them to survive - to invade Earth.

While preparing for the invasion, the aliens accidentally discover with their telescope a wood sign with the scratched words: «Backwoods is a Hub of the Earth». The shabby road sign was in Backwoods, a small, remote Russian village. The alien commanders decided to begin the global invasion by capturing an important strategic point with a mysterious name, "Backwoods". Meanwhile, Russia is in the midst of the Russian Civil War, with Bolsheviks trying to clear the area of anti-communist forces. Both the front line and Ural River split the village of Backwoods in two.

One part of the village is controlled by the Red Army, and the other by the White Army. With the battle for Backwoods in a stalemate, both parties were sick and tired of fighting each other and it seemed like they were settled there for a long time. Neither side had a significant advantage, and the end of the war was a remote possibility. If it weren't for aliens, the situation was not going to change soon.

Main characters 
 Vasily Ivanovich Chapaev: The division commander of Red Army inspired by the folk hero from Furmanov's works.
 Pete: Chapaev's holder of an order. He is described as an oddball in the game, yet is Chapaev's most trusted ally.
 Anka: A skilled scouter and expert counter-terrorist hunting extremist groups, and an arms and demolitions expert.

Development 

The idea of making an adventure game with Pete and Chapaev as main characters arose sometime in early 1996, as the editors of SBG Magazine e-zine were speculating on the idea of a "perfect adventure game" and its possible publisher. Discussions led to the decision of making their own game in that genre, with the three main heroes of popular jokes as protagonists. Afterwards, development process started sometime in mid-1996. The entire editorial staff of the e-zine were involved in the development process, with Vyacheslav Pismenny as the project's lead script writer and Oleg Zakharov as the lead artist.

In December 1997, the editors officially announced the game through the issue #797 of the SBG Magazine. Titled "The Birth of a BlockBuster or How to Make an Adventure Game in 9 Months...", the article partially covered the development process, included the game's synopsis, and presented a dozen screenshots. In addition to that, Pismenny gave interviews to several video game magazines, including Game World Navigator. It was around that time that the contract with the publisher, Buka Entertainment, was signed. The game's development took SBG Studio (later renamed to S.K.I.F.) two and a half years to finish; one extra year before the planned release.

Its release marked the first 3-CD game release in Russia. Labelled a "jewel box" release, its development model was recognized to cut production costs of all copies, increasing the total print produced. Regardless, the collector's edition was released shortly afterwards as well. The game also propelled the "Russian adventure game" genre, expanding Russia's recognition as a video game producer on a global scale, alongside releases including Pilot Brothers: Chasing the Striped Elephant (Russian: Братья Пилоты: По следам полосатого слона), and GAG (Russian: ГЭГ).

In June 1998, a non-interactive demo of the game was released, which included descriptive information about the game as well as animated scenes from it. Ahead of the game's scheduled retail release of Q3 1998, a video demo was presented as part of its marketing strategy, showing a few characters and locations from the game. The game was released in early November 1998.

On September 11, 2014, the original version was released for Android devices as shareware. Buka Entertainment remained the publisher, while ElTechs ported the game by means of virtualization.

Remastered version 

On February 18, 2016, a remastered version compatible with newer Windows operating systems and wide-screen displays was released on Steam. It features both a unitary cursor system and the traditional system, with major quality-of-life improvements. These include revocalized dialogues, more detailed backgrounds for certain locations, and the localization of the text to English. However, audio and certain graphic components such as text on signs were not translated.

A portrait of Vladimir Putin as the Emperor of Russia was also inserted; at the time of the game's original release, he was still the head of the Russian Federal Security Service (FSB).

External links 
 Unofficial Red Comrades website

References 

1998 video games
Android (operating system) games
iOS games
Linux games
macOS games
Point-and-click adventure games
ScummVM-supported games
Single-player video games
Video games developed in Russia
Windows games
Buka Entertainment games